Kirsten Vlieghuis (born 17 May 1976 in Hengelo, Overijssel) is a former freestyle swimmer from The Netherlands, who won two bronze medals at the 1996 Summer Olympics in Atlanta, United States, in the 400m and 800m freestyle competition. She also competed in the 2000 Summer Olympics.

Vlieghuis won the 1991 European Junior Swimming Championships in the 400m and 800m freestyle, and won a bronze medal in the 800m freestyle at the 1998 World Aquatics Championships in Perth, Australia. She won the 800m freestyle event in the 1998 Goodwill Games. She retired from competitive swimming in 2001.

References

External links
 Profile on Zwemkroniek.com (in Dutch)
 Dutch Olympic Committee

1976 births
Living people
Olympic swimmers of the Netherlands
Swimmers at the 1996 Summer Olympics
Swimmers at the 2000 Summer Olympics
Olympic bronze medalists for the Netherlands
Sportspeople from Hengelo
Olympic bronze medalists in swimming
Dutch female freestyle swimmers
World Aquatics Championships medalists in swimming
European Aquatics Championships medalists in swimming
Medalists at the 1996 Summer Olympics
Competitors at the 1998 Goodwill Games
20th-century Dutch women